Cade Jared Benjamin Smith (born May 9, 1999) is a Canadian professional baseball pitcher in the Cleveland Guardians organization.

Career
Smith attended Mennonite Educational Institute in Abbotsford, British Columbia, Canada. He was drafted by the Minnesota Twins in the 16th round of the 2017 Major League Baseball draft, but did not sign and played college baseball at University of Hawaii at Manoa.

After going undrafted in the 2020 MLB draft, which was shortened due to the Covid-19 pandemic, Smith signed with the Cleveland Indians. He spent his first professional season in 2021, pitching for the Lynchburg Hillcats and Lake County Captains. In 2022, he played for Lake County and Akron RubberDucks. After the season, he pitched in the Arizona Fall League.

In 2023, Smith was selected to play for the Canadian national baseball team in the 2023 World Baseball Classic.

References

External links

1999 births
Living people
Canadian baseball players
Baseball pitchers
Hawaii Rainbow Warriors baseball players
Victoria HarbourCats players
Lynchburg Hillcats players
Lake County Captains players
Akron RubberDucks players
Peoria Javelinas players
2023 World Baseball Classic players